The Leader of the Opposition in Rajya Sabha is an elected Member of Rajya Sabha who leads the official opposition in the Upper House of the Parliament of India. The Leader of the Opposition in the Rajya Sabha is the parliamentary chairperson of the largest political party in the Rajya Sabha that is not in government.

History
In the Rajya Sabha until 1969, the title of opposition leader only existed de facto and had no formal recognition, status or privilege. Later, the leader of the opposition was given official recognition and their salary and allowances was extended by the Act, 1977. Since then, the leader in the Rajya Sabha should satisfy three conditions, namely,

 he should be a member of the House 
 of the party in opposition to the Government having the greatest numerical strength and
 be recognised by the Chairperson of the Rajya Sabha

In December 1969, the Congress Party (O) was recognised as the main opposition party in the parliament while its leader, Shyam Nandan Mishra plays the role of opposition leader. M. S. Gurupadaswamy was later elected the leader of opposition in the Rajya Sabha after Shyam Nandan Prasad Mishra completed his tenure. However, Gurupadaswamy's appointment was declared with no formal announcement.

Role and responsibilities

The Leader of Opposition (LoP) looks at government policies formulated for the rights of minorities and demands debate and criticises the government if ruling party tries to avoid debates on such policy. LoP also debates on the country's foreign relations and trade when it poses security threats on the national security.

Privileges and salary
Opposition leaders plays a significant role in government policies and their implementation by the ruling party. Sometimes, opposition leaders questions government about the country's national security and development. After the constitution of India created a separate law on 1 November 1977 for opposition leaders, the salary was extended.

List of leaders of the opposition in Rajya Sabha
Following members have been the leaders of the opposition in the Rajya Sabha.

Deputy Leader of the Opposition

Anand Sharma
08 June 2014 – 02 April 2022
P. Chidambaram
03 April 2022 - 31 Jan 2023
Pramod Tiwari
13 March 2023 - Incumbent

See also
Vice-President of India (Chairperson of the Rajya Sabha)
Deputy Chairperson of the Rajya Sabha
Leader of the Opposition in Lok Sabha
Leader of the House in Rajya Sabha
Leader of the House in Lok Sabha
Secretary General of the Rajya Sabha

References

Further reading 
 

Lists of members of the Rajya Sabha
Leaders of the Opposition in the Rajya Sabha
Leaders of the Opposition
India